Virtus.pro (VP) is an international esports organization founded in 2003 in Russia and acquired by Armenian investors in 2022. The organization has players competing in such games as Counter-Strike: Global Offensive, Dota 2, Rainbow Six Siege, PUBG Mobile, and Warface.

Virtus.pro's Dota 2 team has participated in multiple Majors, winning record (tied with Team Secret) 5 of them and becoming the best Dota Pro Circuit first season team. Their League of Legends team won LCL Spring 2017.

VP's former Polish CS:GO team is considered one of the best teams in the history of Counter-Strike, winning the EMS One Katowice 2014 Major and several other premier tournaments. VP's current CS:GO team, named Outsiders, won the IEM Rio Major 2022 and are the current defending champions.

Ownership and naming 
In November 2015, the team got an investment of over US$100,000,000 from Alisher Usmanov's USM Holdings. From 2015 to 2022 Virtus.pro was part of the ESforce Holding (and also part of VK). In March 2022 Virtus.pro created a new tag, Outsiders, due to the requirements of tournament operators and their claims to VP's parent company (VK) ties with the Russian government. Outsiders tag is a neutral name for the team.

In September 2022 Virtus.pro announced the acquisition of the club by Armenian investor Aram Karamanukyan. He became the new CEO of the club. Since then, in Dota 2 and other games, the club has been playing under its genuine name Virtus.pro, but continues to play in CS:GO as Outsiders. The new CEO claimed that he "contacted ESL [CS:GO tournament operator] to discuss the matter of performing under the name Virtus.pro" and "provided all supporting documents and are now awaiting a decision."

Current divisions

Counter-Strike: Global Offensive

History 

On January 25, 2014, Virtus.pro signed the five member roster of AGAiN, Janusz "Snax" Pogorzelski, and Golden Five players Wiktor "TaZ" Wojtas, Filip "Neo" Kubski. Virtus.pro won EMS One Katowice 2014 by beating Ninjas in Pyjamas in the finals. The team then got 5–8 at ESL One Cologne 2014. Virtus.pro won at ESEA in April 2015. The team then beat Natus Vincere to win CEVO Season 7 in July 2014.

In October 2015, it was announced that Virtus.pro had joined an esports team trade union along with a dozen other teams.

In 2016, Virtus.pro made it to the quarterfinals in MLG Columbus after beating G2 Esports 2–0 in a best-of-three game. The team then went on to win in the inaugural ELeague season, winning $390,000. In December 2016, Virtus.pro re-signed the roster for another four years. In 2017, Virtus.pro finishes 2nd place at the ELEAGUE Atlanta major, winning $150k, and won DreamHack Masters - Las Vegas 2017, winning $200k. Virtus.pro finished 2nd place at EPICENTER 2017, winning $100k.

Due to poor results, on December 13, 2018, Virtus.pro CS:GO roster was suspended.

"Vegi" replaced "Toao" in the active squad and "Snax" takes over IGL role in 2019.  Due to poor results and grown unhappy with the team, Paweł "byali" Bieliński decided to leave Virtus.pro. VP adds Okoliciouz as a replacement for byali. Virtus.pro decided to test some players out, benching Michał "Okoliciouz" Głowaty that had a short lived place in the VP squad, replaced by a stand in Tomasz "phr" Wójcik. Virtus.pro win Polish Esport League Spring in 2019, earning $10,708. This event was the first 1st-place finish since Adrenaline Cyber League 2017, which was won by the original roster. In December 2019, Virtus.pro announced that they have completed the signing of the AVANGAR roster, benching the Polish roster.

In May 2020, Virtus.pro acquired "YEKINDAR" from pro100 as "buster" steps down from the starting lineup. Additionally, "Flatra" joined as an assistant coach.

The roster has been competing under the name Outsiders since early March 2022, following several tournament organizers banning esports teams suspected to have ties to the Russian government. Under the Outsiders tag the team won IEM Rio Major 2022, beating Heroic in the final.

Roster

Dota 2

History 
Virtus.pro attended The International 2014 and placed 5th-6th at The International 2015. Virtus.pro released its squad after failing to qualify for The International 2016, but reformed shortly after. In November 2016, the team won The Summit 6 LAN event, sweeping OG 3–0 in a best-of-five series. Virtus.pro placed 5th-6th at The International 2017. Virtus.pro wins ESL One Hamburg 2017, the first major of the 2017-2018 Dota Pro Circuit season. In 2018, Virtus.pro won four majors, winning ESL One Katowice 2018, The Bucharest Major and ESL One Birmingham 2018; they also became the first team to win two ESL One majors back-to-back. In the new season of the 2018-2019 Dota Pro Circuit season, they became the winner of the first major of the season, the Kuala Lumpur Major.

Despite being second place on 2018-2019 Dota Pro Circuit season and one of the favorites to win The International 2019, Virtus.pro got knocked out of the tournament by Royal Never Give Up, ending their journey with a 9th-12th place. After the disappointing  run, the roster was rebuilt, with Ramzes and 9pasha left the team after staying with the team for almost three years. 

On April 1, 2020, Virtus.pro announced its second Dota 2 lineup: VP.Prodigy. On November 5, a new roster is announced consisting of the current VP.Prodigy's roster, leading to impressive results in the Dota Pro Circuit regional leagues in 2021. 

Following the Russian invasion of Ukraine, Virtus.pro roster played under the 'Outsiders' temporary tag to avoid ESL's ban on Russian esports organisations. During a qualifying match leading up to ESL One Stockholm Major, player Ivan "Pure" Moskalenko drew a Z sign on the minimap, which was widely interpreted as expressing support for Russian invasion of Ukraine, a claim which Moskalenko later denied.

In response, Virtus.pro terminated its contract with Moskalenko, while tournament organisers, Beyond the Summit, in consultation with Valve, disqualified the team from the competition, issuing a retroactive forfeit for every match the team played.

Roster

Rainbow Six Siege 
On May 16, 2020, Virtus.pro enters the Rainbow Six scene by acquiring the roster of forZe Esports.

Roster

PlayerUnknown's Battlegrounds 
On December 14, 2020, Virtus.pro signs Northern Lights roster in PUBG PC. H1RUZEN moved to Coach and Dyrem joined as manager.

Roster

Former divisions

Fortnite 
On July 19, 2018, Virtus.pro opened a division of Fortnite, the first players in the new discipline were Arthur "7ssk7" Kurshin and Jamal "Jamside" Saydayev. On September 21, 2018, Dmitry "HURMA" Heins and Seid-Magomed "FiveSkill" Edilgireev joined the organization. On October 16, 2019, "FiveSkill" and "HURMA" leave the team. On April 29, 2021, VP announced their decision to temporarily leave the discipline.

League of Legends 
On June 28, 2014, Virtus.pro acquired the roster of Dragon Team. Soon the team disbands, but in November 2016 Virtus.pro re-opened its LoL division and acquired the LCL Spot of Vaevictis Syndicate. On September 19, 2017, the organization closed its League of Legends department.

Starcraft 2 
On July 1, 2014, Virtus.pro announced that they closed the StarCraft II section of their organization and that they would now focus on League of Legends instead.

Artifact 
June 21, 2018, long before the official release of the game, Virtus.pro announced its first player in the discipline, a former Hearthstone player Maria "Harleen" Kobzar. On November 23, 2018, Artem "DrHippi" Kravets, who previously defended the colors of Virtus.pro in Hearthstone, and Olzhas "Naiman" Batyrbekov joined the team. November 29, 2018 Artifact was released on sale. February 27, 2019 "DrHippi" and "Harleen" left the team. On September 10 "Naiman" retires and Virtus.pro leaves Artifact.

References

External links 
 Official website

Dota teams
Counter-Strike teams
Esports teams based in Russia
Heroes of the Storm teams
 
Tom Clancy's Rainbow Six Siege teams